The Faroe Islands competed at the 1992 Summer Paralympics in Barcelona, Spain. The islands' delegation consisted in three athletes competing in two sports. Durid Svensson and Tóra við Keldu represented the Faroe Islands in women's swimming, and Heini Festirstein in men's table tennis.

Við Keldu won the Faroe Islands' only medal, a silver in the S10 100 metre freestyle.

See also 
Faroe Islands at the Paralympics

References

Nations at the 1992 Summer Paralympics
1992
Paralympics